Bridge in East Fallowfield Township is a historic metal truss bridge spanning Unger Run at Atlantic, Crawford County, Pennsylvania. It was built in 1894 by the Wrought Iron Bridge Company.  It is a multiple span, metal truss bridge.

It was added to the National Register of Historic Places in 1988.

References

Road bridges on the National Register of Historic Places in Pennsylvania
Bridges completed in 1894
Bridges in Crawford County, Pennsylvania
National Register of Historic Places in Crawford County, Pennsylvania
Wrought iron bridges in the United States
Truss bridges in the United States